Vault: Def Leppard Greatest Hits (1980–1995) is the first greatest hits album and the second compilation album by English hard rock band Def Leppard. The album was originally released in the band's home country on 23 October 1995 by Mercury Records. It was released in North America a few days later on 31 October by the same label. Vault went on to be certified gold in four countries, platinum in three and multi-platinum in two. In the US, the album is currently certified 5× platinum by the RIAA, and in June 2011 it topped the five million mark in sales there. It won Metal Edge magazine's 1995 Readers' Choice Award for "Best Hits or Compilation Album."

The album featured one newly recorded song, "When Love & Hate Collide", which was released as a single on 2 October 1995.

The collection's track listing varied by region, although none of the releases had any songs from the band's 1980 debut album, On Through the Night on the track listings.

On 23 October 1995, to promote the release of Vault, the band played acoustic shows on three continents in one day: Tangiers, Morocco in Africa, London, England, UK in Europe, and Vancouver, British Columbia, Canada in North America. The feat also made the Guinness Book of World Records.

Overview

One new track was recorded for this collection, "When Love & Hate Collide", previously a leftover from the Adrenalize recording sessions. The ballad became the band's joint highest-charting single in the UK, along with 1992's "Let's Get Rocked", hitting No. 2 in the fall of 1995.

The songs are the original album versions, with the following exceptions:
"Pour Some Sugar on Me" is the video edit version. This version actually features an extended, distorted intro, making it longer than the Hysteria version, which has the shorter "Step inside, walk this way" intro.
"Rocket" is the single edit, which runs around two and a half minutes shorter than its Hysteria album counterpart.
"Bringin' on the Heartbreak" fades out slightly earlier than the High 'n' Dry version, as the High 'n' Dry version segues into "Switch 625".

 Artwork, design, and packaging 
The art direction and design for Vault was handled by Exquisite Corpse with photography by Cythia Levine and Ross Halfin. Most covers of the album have a picture of an actual vault, while a limited edition two disc collection has a picture of a green eye with a vault inside the eye. The CD liner notes featured a three-page summary of the band's history by Peter Mensch, who appeared in two of the group's music videos. Although not featured on the North American release, other liner notes feature a note signed by the band members talking about the group's upcoming album, Slang.

 Track variations in different regions 
Although the releases of Vault had most of the same songs, there were some differences between the releases.

Exclusive to the North American release of Vault:
"Miss You in a Heartbeat" (acoustic version)

Exclusive to the European release of Vault:
"Action"
"Make Love Like a Man"
"Heaven Is"

Exclusive to the Japanese release of Vault:
"Rock! Rock! Till You Drop"
"Can't Keep Away From The Flame" (new track)

"Foolin'" does not appear on the European release, but does appear on the North American release and the Japanese release.

The Japanese release features the first official release of the song "Can't Keep Away From the Flame," a song which was later released as a B-side on some of the "Slang" singles. Years later it was included on the deluxe edition of Slang.

 Track listing 

 Personnel 
The following people contributed to Vault'':
Joe Elliott – lead vocals, backing vocals, producer, piano on "Miss You in a Heartbeat"
Steve Clark – guitars, backing vocals
Phil Collen – guitars, backing vocals, producer
Rick Savage – bass, backing vocals, producer
Rick Allen – drums, backing vocals, producer
Robert John "Mutt" Lange – producer, backing vocals
Nigel Green – engineer
Pete Willis – guitars, backing vocals
Mike Shipley – mixing, producer, engineer
Vivian Campbell – guitars, backing vocals, producer
Pete Woodroffe – producer, engineer, piano on "Miss You in a Heartbeat"
Michael Kamen – string arrangements on "Two Steps Behind" and "When Love & Hate Collide"
Stevie Vann – backing vocals on "When Love & Hate Collide"
Randy Kerber – piano on "When Love & Hate Collide"
Bob Ludwig – mastering

Charts

Weekly charts

Year-end charts

Certifications

References

External links 
Vault: Def Leppard Greatest Hits (1980–1995) at DefLeppard.com (with lyrics available for all songs).

Def Leppard compilation albums
1995 greatest hits albums
Albums produced by Mike Shipley
Albums produced by Robert John "Mutt" Lange
Mercury Records compilation albums